Antti Erkinjuntti (born 30 May 1986) is a Finnish ice hockey player. He is currently a free agent.

Career statistics

Regular season and playoffs

References

External links

1986 births
Living people
Finnish ice hockey forwards
Rovaniemen Kiekko players
Hokki players
Tappara players
HC TPS players
Lahti Pelicans players
SCL Tigers players
Vaasan Sport players
HK Dukla Michalovce players
People from Rovaniemi
Sportspeople from Lapland (Finland)
Finnish expatriate ice hockey players in Slovakia
Finnish expatriate ice hockey players in Switzerland